This article contains information about the literary events and publications of 1993.

Events
September 24 – Former president and writer Zviad Gamsakhurdia returns to Georgia to establish a government in exile in the city of Zugdidi.
November 17 – Annie Proulx wins the National Book Award in the United States for her novel The Shipping News.
unknown dates
Indrani Aikath Gyaltsen's novel Cranes' Morning appears in India, but proves to be plagiarized from Elizabeth Goudge's The Rosemary Tree (1956); its author will commit suicide in 1994.
Professor Stephen Hawking's A Brief History of Time becomes the longest-running book on The Sunday Times UK bestseller list.
Reality television contest Million's Poet (شاعر المليون) is launched in the United Arab Emirates.
Todur Zanet's translation of Jean Racine's Bajazet is produced by Moldova 1, a seminal moment in the development of Gagauz-language theatre.
The Guodian Chu Slips, including the oldest known version of Laozi's Tao Te Ching, a chapter from the Book of Rites, content from the Book of Documents and the previously lost Xing Zi Ming Chu, written on bamboo and dated before 300 BCE (later Warring States period), are found in a tomb near Guodian, Jingmen (Hubei province of China).

New books

Fiction
Stephen Ambrose – Band of Brothers
Jeffrey Archer – Honour Among Thieves
David Banks – Iceberg
Iain Banks – Complicity
Pat Barker – The Eye in the Door
Greg Bear – Moving Mars
Daniel Blythe – The Dimension Riders
William Boyd – The Blue Afternoon
Sandra Boynton – Barnyard Dance!
Christopher Bulis – Shadowmind
Anthony Burgess – A Dead Man in Deptford
Ramsey Campbell – Alone with the Horrors: The Great Short Fiction of Ramsey Campbell 1961-1991
Tom Clancy – Without Remorse
Deborah Joy Corey – Losing Eddie
Bernard Cornwell – Rebel
Robert Crais – Free Fall
Maurice G. Dantec – La Sirène rouge
Peter Darvill-Evans – Deceit
Hollace Davids and Paul Davids – Mission from Mount Yoda
Lindsey Davis – Poseidon's Gold
L. Sprague de Camp – Rivers of Time
Stephen R. Donaldson – The Gap into Power: A Dark and Hungry God Arises
Roddy Doyle – Paddy Clarke Ha Ha Ha
Helen Dunmore – Zennor in Darkness
Shusaku Endo (遠藤 周作) – Deep River (深い河)
Steve Erickson – Arc d'X
Jeffrey Eugenides – The Virgin Suicides
Richard Paul Evans – The Christmas Box
Sebastian Faulks – Birdsong
Amanda Filipacchi – Nude Men
Neil Gaiman
The Sandman: A Game of You (graphic novel; fifth in The Sandman series)
The Sandman: Fables & Reflections (graphic novel; sixth in The Sandman series)
John Gardner – Never Send Flowers
Ernest Gaines – A Lesson Before Dying
William Gibson – Virtual Light
John Grisham – The Client
Hal (a Macintosh IIcx computer) and Scott French (programmer) – Just This Once
Jesse Lee Kercheval – The Museum of Happiness
Stephen King – Nightmares & Dreamscapes
Nancy Kress – The Aliens of Earth
John le Carré – The Night Manager
Lois Lowry – The Giver
Robert Ludlum – The Scorpio Illusion
Amin Maalouf – Le Rocher de Tanios
David A. McIntee – White Darkness
Andy McNab – Bravo Two Zero
David Malouf – Remembering Babylon
Gita Mehta – A River Sutra (short stories)
Jim Mortimore
Blood Heat
(with Andy Lane) – Lucifer Rising 
Taslima Nasrin – Lajja
Patrick O'Brian – Clarissa Oakes
Kate Orman – The Left-Handed Hummingbird
Tim Pears – In the Place of Fallen Leaves
Neil Penswick – The Pit
Terry Pratchett – Men at Arms
E. Annie Proulx – The Shipping News
Jean Raspail – Sept cavaliers
Ishmael Reed – Japanese by Spring
Anne Rice – Lasher
Gareth Roberts – The Highest Science
J. Jill Robinson – Lovely In Her Bones
Nigel Robinson – Birthright
W. G. Sebald – The Emigrants
Will Self – My Idea of Fun
Vikram Seth – A Suitable Boy
Ahdaf Soueif – In the Eye of the Sun
Danielle Steel – Vanished
Emil Tode (Tõnu Õnnepalu) – Piiririik (Border State)
Jesús Torbado – El peregrino
Sue Townsend – Adrian Mole: The Wilderness Years
Scott Turow – Pleading Guilty
Kathy Tyers – The Truce at Bakura
Buket Uzuner – The Sound of Fishsteps (Balık İzlerinin Sesi)
Andrew Vachss – Shella
Mario Vargas Llosa – Death in the Andes (Lituma en los Andes)
Ivan Vladislavic – The Folly
Robert James Waller – Slow Waltz at Cedar Bend
Irvine Welsh – Trainspotting
Herman Wouk – The Hope
Austin Wright – Tony and Susan
Timothy Zahn – The Last Command
Roger Zelazny – A Night in the Lonesome October

Children and young people
Janet and Allan Ahlberg – It Was a Dark and Stormy Night
Nelson Algren (posthumous) – He Swung and He Missed
Chris Van Allsburg – The Sweetest Fig
Malorie Blackman – Operation Gadgetman!
Susan Cooper – The Boggart
Richard Dalby – Mistletoe & Mayhem: Horrific Tales for the Holidays
Mem Fox – Time for Bed
Cornelia Funke – Wild Chicks
Johanna Hurwitz – New Shoes for Silvia
Jim Murphy – Across America on an Emigrant Train
Larry Niven (with Alicia Austin) – Bridging the Galaxies
Rodman Philbrick – Freak the Mighty
Allen Say – Grandfather's Journey
Marjorie W. Sharmat – Nate the Great and the Pillowcase
Francisco Calvo Serraller (with Willi Glasauer) – Grandes Maestros de la Pintura
Theresa Tomlinson – The Forestwife (first in the Forestwife trilogy)
Nancy Willard – A Starlit Somersault Downhill

Drama
Parv Bancil – Ungrateful Dead
April De Angelis – Playhouse Creatures
David Hare – The Absence of War
Tom Stoppard – Arcadia

Poetry

Leonard Cohen – Stranger Music
Paul Durcan – A Snail in My Prime: New and Selected Poems
Dejan Stojanović – Krugovanje: 1978–1987 (Circling: 1978–1987)

Non-fiction
Martin Amis – Visiting Mrs Nabokov: And Other Excursions
Khursheed Kamal Aziz – The Murder of History in Pakistan: A critique of history textbooks used in Pakistan
Malcolm Bradbury – The Modern British Novel
Richard Dawkins – Viruses of the Mind
Shobha De and Khushwant Singh – Uncertain Liaisons
Alain Erlande-Brandenburg – Cathedrals and Castles: Building in the Middle Ages
Alexandre Farnoux – Cnossos : L'archéologie d'un rêve
Zlata Filipović – Zlata's Diary
Bob Flowerdew – The Organic Gardener
Tamala Krishna Goswami – Happiness is a Science – Aditi's Vow
Linda Holmen, Mary Santella-Johnson and Bill Watterson – Teaching with Calvin and Hobbes
Laënnec Hurbon – Voodoo: Truth and Fantasy
Linda Johns – Sharing a Robin's Life
Leon M. Lederman and Dick Teresi – The God Particle
James Lees-Milne – People and Places: Country House Donors and the National Trust
Jean Marigny – Vampires: The World of the Undead
Scott McCloud – Understanding Comics
Ram Swarup – Hindu View of Christianity and Islam
Miranda Seymour – Ottoline Morrell: Life on the Grand Scale
Howard Stern – Private Parts
Walter Stewart – Too Big to Fail
Margaret Thatcher – The Downing Street Years
Gordon S. Wood – The Radicalism of the American Revolution

Births
July 3 - Hayeon Lim, South Korean author
July 5 - Leah Johnson, American author
August 1 - Tomi Adeyemi, Nigerian–American novelist
August 26 - Nancy Yi Fan, Chinese American author
December 22 - Leema Dhar, Indian poet and novelist
unknown date - Idza Luhumyo, Kenyan short story writer

Deaths
January 6 – Ștefan Baciu, Romanian and Brazilian poet, novelist and literary promoter (born 1918)
January 18 – Eleanor Hibbert (Jean Plaidy, etc.), English historical novelist (born 1906)
January 22 – Kōbō Abe (安部 公房), Japanese novelist and playwright (born 1924)
January 29 – Gustav Hasford, American marine, novelist, journalist, poet and book thief (born 1947)
February 5 – William Pène du Bois, American author and illustrator (born 1916)
March 9 – C. Northcote Parkinson, English naval historian and critic of business methods (born 1909)
March 16 – Natália Correia, Portuguese writer, poet and social activist (b. 1923)
April 15
Leslie Charteris, Anglo-American thriller writer (born 1907)
Robert Westall, English novelist and children's writer (born 1929)
April 23 – Bertus Aafjes, Dutch poet (born 1914)
May 6 – Dorothy B. Hughes, American crime writer and critic (born 1904)
June 19 – Sir William Golding, English novelist and poet (born 1911)
July 10 – Ruth Krauss, American children's author and poet (born 1901)
August 28 – E. P. Thompson, English political historian (born 1924)
September – Leonte Răutu, Bessarabian-born Romanian propagandist and censor (born 1910)
September 7 – Eugen Barbu, Romanian novelist, playwright and journalist (born 1924)
September 16 – Oodgeroo Noonuccal, aboriginal Australian poet (born 1920)
November 1 – Maeve Brennan, Irish short story writer and journalist (born 1917)
November 22 – Anthony Burgess, English novelist (born 1917)
December 4 – Margaret Landon, American historical novelist (born 1903)
December 28 – William L. Shirer, American journalist and historian (born 1904)
December 31 – Zviad Gamsakhurdia, Georgian dissident, scientist and writer (possible suicide, born 1913)
Unknown date – Parijat (Bishnu Kumari Waiba), Nepalese novelist and poet (born 1937)

Awards
Nobel Prize for Literature: Toni Morrison
Camões Prize: Rachel de Queiroz

Australia
The Australian/Vogel Literary Award: Helen Demidenko, The Hand That Signed The Paper
C. J. Dennis Prize for Poetry: Les Murray, Translations from the Natural World
Kenneth Slessor Prize for Poetry: Les Murray, Translations from the Natural World
Mary Gilmore Prize: Jill Jones, The Mask and Jagged Star
Miles Franklin Award: Alex Miller, The Ancestor Game

Canada
See 1993 Governor General's Awards for a complete list
Edna Staebler Award for Creative Non-Fiction: Liza Potvin (co-winner), White Lies (for my mother) 
Edna Staebler Award for Creative Non-Fiction: Elizabeth Hay (co-winner), The Only Snow in Havana

France
Prix Goncourt: Amin Maalouf, Le Rocher de Tanios
Prix Décembre: René de Obaldia. Exobiographie
Prix Médicis French: Emmanuèle Bernheim, Sa femme
Prix Médicis International: Paul Auster, Leviathan

United Kingdom
Booker Prize: Roddy Doyle, Paddy Clarke Ha Ha Ha
Carnegie Medal for children's literature: Robert Swindells, Stone Cold
James Tait Black Memorial Prize for fiction: Caryl Phillips, Crossing the River
James Tait Black Memorial Prize for biography: Richard Holmes, Dr Johnson and Mr Savage
Cholmondeley Award: Patricia Beer, George Mackay Brown, P. J. Kavanagh, Michael Longley
Whitbread Book Award: Joan Brady, Theory of War
The Sunday Express Book of the Year: William Boyd, The Blue Afternoon

United States
Agnes Lynch Starrett Poetry Prize: Natasha Saj, Red Under the Skin
Aiken Taylor Award for Modern American Poetry: George Starbuck
American Academy of Arts and Letters gold Medal for Belles Lettres, Elizabeth Hardwick
Bernard F. Connors Prize for Poetry: Stephen Yenser, "Blue Guide"
Compton Crook Award: Holly Lisle, Fire in the Mist
Frost Medal: William Stafford
National Book Award for Fiction: E. Annie Proulx, The Shipping News
National Book Critics Circle Award: Alan Lomax, The Land Where the Blues Began
Nebula Award: Kim Stanley Robinson, Red Mars
Newbery Medal for children's literature: Cynthia Rylant, Missing May
PEN/Faulkner Award for Fiction: E. Annie Proulx, Postcards
Pulitzer Prize for Drama: Tony Kushner, Angels in America: Millennium Approaches
Pulitzer Prize for Fiction: Robert Olen Butler, A Good Scent from a Strange Mountain
Pulitzer Prize for Poetry: Louise Gluck, The Wild Iris
Whiting Awards:
Fiction: Jeffrey Eugenides, Dagoberto Gilb, Sigrid Nunez, Janet Peery, Lisa Shea
Plays: Kevin Kling
Poetry: Mark Levine, Nathaniel Mackey (poetry/fiction), Dionisio D. Martinez, Kathleen Peirce
Writers Guild of America Awards 1993 (March 13): Best Adapted Screenplay: Steven Zaillian, Schindler's List

Elsewhere
Premio Nadal: Rafael Argullol Murgadas, La razón del mal

References

 
Years of the 20th century in literature